Miller Creek is a stream in the U.S. state of South Dakota. It is a tributary of Polo Creek which it meets adjacent to I-90 approximately 5.5 miles east of Spearfish.

Miller Creek has the name of John Miller, a pioneer homesteader.

See also
List of rivers of South Dakota

References

Rivers of Lawrence County, South Dakota
Rivers of South Dakota